Forough Abbasi (born 15 September 1993 in Shiraz, Iran) is an alpine skier from Iran. She competed for Iran at the 2014 Winter Olympics and at the 2018 Winter Olympics in the slalom competition, where she achieved a top 50 finish both times.

See also
Iran at the 2014 Winter Olympics
Iran at the 2018 Winter Olympics

References

External links
 

1993 births
Living people
Olympic alpine skiers of Iran
Alpine skiers at the 2014 Winter Olympics
Alpine skiers at the 2018 Winter Olympics
Iranian female alpine skiers
People from Shiraz
Alpine skiers at the 2017 Asian Winter Games
Sportspeople from Fars province
21st-century Iranian women